Emil Wolf (July 30, 1922 – June 2, 2018) was a Czech-born American physicist who made advancements in physical optics, including diffraction, coherence properties of optical fields, spectroscopy of partially coherent radiation, and the theory of direct scattering and inverse scattering. He was also the author of numerous other contributions to optics.

Life and career
Wolf was born into a Jewish family in Prague, Czechoslovakia. He was forced to leave his native country when the Germans invaded. After brief periods in Italy and France (where he worked for the Czech government in exile), he moved to the United Kingdom in 1940. He received his B.Sc. in Mathematics and Physics (1945), and Ph.D. in Mathematics from Bristol University, England, in 1948. Between 1951 and 1954 he worked at the University of Edinburgh with Max Born, writing the famous textbook Principles of Optics now usually known simply as Born and Wolf. After a period on the Faculty of the University of Manchester, he moved to the United States in 1959 to take a position at the University of Rochester. He became a naturalized U.S. citizen and was the Wilson Professor of Optical Physics at the University of Rochester. He was president of the Optical Society of America in 1978. Until his death Wolf resided in Cloverwood in Pittsford, New York, with his wife.

Wolf predicted a new mechanism that produces redshift and blueshift, that is not due to moving sources (Doppler effect), that has subsequently been confirmed experimentally (called the Wolf effect). Technically, he found that two non-Lambertian sources that emit beamed energy, can interact in a way that causes a shift in the spectral lines. It is analogous to a pair of tuning forks with similar frequencies (pitches), connected together mechanically with a sounding board; there is a strong coupling that results in the resonant frequencies getting "dragged down" in pitch. The Wolf effect can produce either redshifts or blueshifts, depending on the observer's point of view, but is redshifted when the observer is head-on. A subsequent 1999 article by Sisir Roy et al. have suggested that the Wolf effect may explain discordant redshift in certain quasars.

Wolf remained an active teacher, researcher and author well into his 80s. He died on June 2, 2018, aged 95.

Works
Wolf was a very well known book author in the field of optics. Along with Max Born, he co-wrote Principles of Optics one of the standard textbooks of optics commonly known as "Born and Wolf". In addition he co-authored, with Leonard Mandel, Optical Coherence and Quantum Optics. He also authored Introduction to the Theory of Coherence and Polarization of Light and Selected Works of Emil Wolf with Commentary (World Scientific Publishing, 2001). Furthermore, he edited the Progress in Optics series of books, for Elsevier, from its inception in 1962.

Awards, memberships and degrees

Awards
Frederic Ives Medal of the Optical Society of America (1977)
Albert A. Michelson Medal of the Franklin Institute (1980)
Max Born Award of the Optical Society of America (1987)
Marconi Medal of the Italian National Research Council (1987)
Gold Medal of the Czechoslovak Academy of Science (1991)
Medal of the Union of Czechoslovak Mathematicians and Physicists (1991)
Gold Medal of Palacký University of Olomouc, Czechoslovakia (1991)
 Esther Hoffman Beller Medal (2002)
 G. G. Stokes Award of SPIE (2010)

Memberships
Honorary member of the Optical Society of America (President in 1978)
Honorary member of the Optical Societies of India and Australia

Honorary degrees
University of Groningen, the Netherlands (1989)
University of Edinburgh (1990)
Palacký University of Olomouc (1992)
University of Bristol (1997)
Université Laval, Quebec (1997)
University of Franche-Comté, France (1999)
Aalborg University, Denmark (1999).

See also
Past presidents of the Optical Society of America
Progress in Optics

References

External links

 Emil Wolf. Home Page at University of Rochester.
 Principles of Optics: Electromagnetic Theory of Propagation, Interference and Diffraction of Light (English) Sample chapters.
 
 Articles Published by early OSA Presidents Journal of the Optical Society of America
 Gregory J. Gbur (2018) RIP Emil Wolf, 1922-2018)

1922 births
2018 deaths
American physicists
Optical physicists
Fellows of Optica (society)
Czechoslovak emigrants to the United Kingdom
Czechoslovak emigrants to the United States
Czech Jews
Scientists from Prague
Alumni of the University of Bristol
University of Rochester faculty
Presidents of Optica (society)
People with acquired American citizenship
Jews who immigrated to the United Kingdom to escape Nazism